Mattie the Goose-boy is a 1977 Hungarian animated film directed by Attila Dargay. It is based on the eponymous poem, written in 1804 by Mihály Fazekas.

Cast

Trivia

This film was dubbed in Arabic under the title "ياسر والشهبندر" (Yasser and Shahbandar) but instead of being released as a movie, it was released as a 4 episode series.

References

External links
 
 

1977 films
1977 animated films
1970s Hungarian-language films
Hungarian animated films
Hungarian comedy films
Hungarian children's films
Films directed by Attila Dargay